The 2012 South Korean Figure Skating Championships were the South Korean Figure Skating Championships for the 2011–12 season. They were the 66th edition of those championships held. They were organized by the Korean Skating Union. The main sponsors were KB financial group and Hyundai Motor group. The media sponsor was MBC sports+.

Skaters competed in the disciplines of men's and ladies' singles on the senior, junior, and novice levels for the title of national champion of South Korea. The results of the national championships were used to choose the Korean teams to the 2012 World Figure Skating Championships and the 2012 Four Continents Figure Skating Championships.

The competition was held between 6 January and 8 January, 2012 in Seoul.

Competition notes
 Kim Yuna did not compete.

Senior Men

Senior Ladies

Junior results

Junior Men

External links
 Results** 

2012
2012 in figure skating
Figure skating,2012
January 2012 sports events in South Korea